Kołakowski (feminine: Kołakowska) is Polish-language surname. Emigrants with this surname may have also been recorded as Kolakoski, Kolakosky, Kollakowski , Kolackovsky, Kolakowsky , Colakovski , Kollakowsky and Cholakovski. When transliterated via Russian (Poland was parth of the Russian Empire), the surname may have the forms  Kolakovsky,  Kolakovski (feminine: Kolakovskaya).

Notable people with this surname include:

Lech Kołakowski (born 1963), Polish politician
Leszek Kołakowski (1927–2009), Polish philosopher and historian of ideas 
Robert Kołakowski (born 1963), Polish politician
Victoria Kolakowski (born 1961), American lawyer

, Polish athlete
Agnieszka Kołakowska (born 1960), Polish philosopher, philologist, translator and essayist

 William Kolakoski (1944-1997),  American artist and recreational mathematician
 (1906-1977), Russian botanist and paleobotanist 

Polish-language surnames